Gulf FM may refer to:

 Radio 4 News FM, a rolling news service broadcast by the BBC during the Gulf War
 Gulf FM (Australia) (ACMA callsign: 5GFM), a community radio station based on the Yorke Peninsula, South Australia